Halil Berktay is a Turkish historian at Ibn Haldun University and was columnist for the daily Taraf.

Life and career
Berktay was born into an intellectual Turkish communist family. His father, Erdoğan Berktay, was a member of the old clandestine Communist Party of Turkey. As a result of this influence, Halil Berktay remained a Maoist for two decades before he became "an independent left-intellectual".

After graduating from Robert College in 1964, Berktay studied economics at Yale University receiving his Bachelor of Arts in 1968 and Master of Arts in 1969. He went on to earn a PhD from Birmingham University in 1990. He worked as lecturer at Ankara University from 1969 to 1971 and from 1978 to 1983. He took part in the founding of the Yale chapter of the Students for a Democratic Society.

Between 1992 and 1997, he taught at both the Middle East Technical University and Boğaziçi University. He was a visiting scholar at Harvard University in 1997, and taught at Sabancı University before returning to Harvard in 2006. He is currently a professor at Ibn Haldun University where he is also the head of the History Department.

Berktay's research areas are the history and historiography of Turkish nationalism in the 20th century. He studies social and economic history (including that of Europe,  especially medieval history) from a comparative perspective. He has also written on the construction of Turkish national memory.

After Taner Akçam, Berktay was one of the first Turkish historians to acknowledge the Armenian genocide. In September 2005, Berktay and fellow historians, including Murat Belge, Edhem Eldem, Selim Deringil, convened at an academic conference to discuss the fall of the Ottoman Empire.

As a supporter of open dialogue in Turkey regarding the Armenian genocide and Turkey's denial of it, Berktay has received threats in his country. He has two daughters, Ada Berktay and Aslıgül Berktay, from two separate marriages.

Berktay uncovered that the Turkish government purged a lot of the evidence and documents on the Armenian genocide from the Turkish archives. According to him, the purge was "most probably implemented by Muharrem Nuri Birgi, a former Turkish ambassador to London and NATO and Secretary General of the Turkish Ministry of Foreign Affairs". Berktay also claimed that "at the time he was combing the archives, Nuri Birgi met regularly with a mutual friend and at one point, referring to the Armenians, ruefully confessed: 'We really slaughtered them'".

Currently, he is head of Department of History at Ibn Haldun University in Istanbul, Turkey.

Partial bibliography 

 Kabileden Feodalizme, Kaynak Yayınları, 1983
 Cumhuriyet İdeolojisi ve Fuad Köprülü, Kaynak Yayınları, 1983
 Bir Dönem Kapanırken, Pencere Yayınları, 1991
 New Approaches to State and Peasant in Ottoman History (eds. Halil Berktay and Suraiya Faroqhi),

References

External links
.

1947 births
Living people
20th-century Turkish historians
Turkish atheists
Academic staff of Sabancı University
Cretan Turks
Robert College alumni
Yale University alumni
Taraf people
Alumni of the University of Birmingham
Historians of Turkey
Academic staff of İbn Haldun Üniversitesi
Turkish former Muslims
21st-century Turkish historians